Aspergillus waksmanii is a homothallic species of fungus in the genus Aspergillus which has been isolated from soil from New Jersey in the United States. It is from the Fumigati section. Several fungi from this section produce heat-resistant ascospores, and the isolates from this section are frequently obtained from locations where natural fires have previously occurred. Aspergillus waksmanii produces apolar indoloterpenes.

Growth and morphology
A. waksmanii has been cultivated on both Czapek yeast extract agar (CYA) plates and Malt Extract Agar Oxoid® (MEAOX) plates. The growth morphology of the colonies can be seen in the pictures below.

References

Further reading
 

waksmanii
Fungi described in 2013